The Cal State Fullerton Titans college football team represented California State University, Fullerton. The Tigers competed in the National Collegiate Athletic Association (NCAA) University Division in the years 1970–1992, and in the Pacific Coast Athletic Association (PCAA) / Big West Conference from 1975–1992. The football program was eliminated following the 1992 season.

The program had 4 head coaches in its 23 seasons of existence.

Coaches

References

Cal State Fullerton

Cal State Fullerton Titans football